The neck riddle is a riddle where the riddler (typically a hero in a folk tale) gains something with the help of an unsolvable riddle.

The name comes from the folk tales of type "Out-riddling the judge" (Aarne–Thompson classification system for folk tales #927), when the hero "saves his neck" (that is, avoids being sentenced to a death by hanging) after outwitting a judge with riddles.

Verlyn Flieger devotes an essay on Bilbo's neck riddle in The Hobbit. Flieger (citing Williamson, Archer Taylor and Hilda Ellis Davidson) defines Neck riddles as "questions that are unanswerable except by the asker, who thus saves his neck by the riddle, for the judge or executioner has promised release in exchange for a riddle that cannot be guessed.". Bilbo's Riddle to Gollum: "What have I got in my pocket", Odin's final riddle to Vafþrúðnir and again Odin, disguised as Gestumblindi with the same riddle to King Heidrek ("What did Odin whisper in Balder's ear before Balder was cremated?"), are neck riddles.

References

Riddles